Syed Imdad Imam Asar Nawab (17 August 1849–17 October 1933) was an Indian Poet, Critic and Writer from Patna, Bihar. He was professor of History and Arabic in Patna College.

Personal life 
Asar was born to Shamsul Ulama titled Syed Wahiduddin Bahadur on 17 August 1849 in Karaipar Surai, near Patna in Bihar, now in Hilsa, Nalanda district.

Asar's sister Rasheed Un Nisa is believed to be first Urdu Language Indian woman novelist.

The Prime Minister of Hyderabad State, Syed Ali Imam and Indian National Congress President Syed Hasan Imam were both sons of Asar.

References 

1849 births
1933 deaths
People from Patna district
Writers from Bihar
People from Gaya district